is a 2012 Nintendo 3DS video game.

References

External links
Official website 

Arc System Works games
Nintendo 3DS games
Nintendo 3DS-only games
2012 video games
Video games developed in Japan